The 1853 New Zealand provincial elections were the first elections in New Zealand to elect members and superintendents to the newly created Provinces of New Zealand. The elections were held between July and September 1853, at the same time as the 1853 New Zealand general elections for the central government, which were held between July and October. The provincial elections had higher voter turnouts than the general elections, with the elections for provincial superintendents (where they were contested) having the highest voter turnout.

Results

Provincial councils

Auckland 
The Auckland Provincial Council was originally made up by 24 members from six electorates: City of Auckland (6), Suburbs of Auckland (4), Pensioner Settlements (4), Northern Division (4), Southern Division (4), and Bay of Islands (2).

New Plymouth 
The New Plymouth Provincial Council (with the province later known as Taranaki Province) was originally made up by nine members from three electorates:
Town of New Plymouth (2), Grey and Bell (4), and Omata (3).

Wellington 

The Wellington Provincial Council was originally made up by eighteen members from five electorates: City of Wellington (7), Wellington Country (3), Hutt (4), Wairarapa and Hawke's Bay (2), and Wanganui and Rangitikei (2).

Nelson 
The Nelson Provincial Council was originally made up by fifteen members from seven electorates: Town of Nelson (5), Waimea East (2), Waimea South (2), Wairau (2), Motueka and Massacre Bay (2), Waimea West (1), and Suburban Districts (1).

Canterbury 
The Canterbury Provincial Council was originally made up by twelve members from four electorates: Town of Christchurch (3), Christchurch Country District (4), Town of Lyttelton (3), and Akaroa (2). In Akaroa, there was a draw for second place between Rev. William Aylmer and William Sefton Moorhouse. The returning officer gave his vote to Aylmer; Moorhouse had a week earlier been elected to the House of Representatives beating Rhodes.

Otago 
The Otago Provincial Council was originally made up by nine members from two electorates: Town of Dunedin (3) and Dunedin Country District (6).

Superintendent elections

Notes

References 
 
 

Provincial elections
Provincial 1853
Provinces of New Zealand